The 2006 Giro d'Italia was the 89th edition of the Giro d'Italia, one of cycling's Grand Tours. It began in the Belgian city of Seraing with a  individual time trial. The race came to a close with a  mass-start road stage that stretched from Museo del Ghisallo to Milan. Twenty two teams entered the race that was won by the Italian Ivan Basso of the  team. Second and third were the Spain José Enrique Gutiérrez and Italian Gilberto Simoni.

Basso won three individual stages, as well as the team time trial, along with his fellow Team CSC riders, and won the overall classification by more than 9 minutes over the next best rider, the largest margin of victory in a Grand Tour in the last three years.

In the other classifications that the race awarded, Paolo Bettini of the  team won the points classification, Quick Step-Innergetic rider Juan Manuel Gárate won the mountains classification, and Paolo Savoldelli of the  won the combination classification.  finished as the winners of the Trofeo Fast Team classification, ranking each of the twenty-two teams contesting the race by lowest cumulative time. The other team classification, the Trofeo Super Team classification, where the teams' riders are awarded points for placing within the top twenty in each stage and the points are then totaled for each team was also won by Phonak.

Teams

Twenty-two teams contested the 2006 Giro. Since it was a UCI ProTour event, the 20 ProTour teams were automatically invited and obligated to send a squad. Race officials also invited two other teams. Each team sent a squad of nine riders, giving the race a 198-man peloton at its outset.

The 22 that competed in the race were:

Race previews and favorites

Route and stages

The 2006 Giro opened, and had its first 4 stages in the South-East of Belgium in the Wallonia region. The Giro organisers chose to locate the opening in this region as a homage to the thousands of Italians who moved to the region following the end of World War II in order to find jobs in the coal mines of the area. It is estimated that as many as 300'000 Belgians of Italian origin live in this area. The 2006 Giro commemorated the deaths of 136 Italian miners who died in the 1956 Bois du Cazier mine disaster.

The race introduced a team time trial stage upon its arrival in Italy. This discipline had been absent from the Giro since edition 1989. It also included  of individual time trials, distributed between the prologue and the long time trial at Pontedera.

It also featured famous climbs, such as the steep Mortirolo and the Monte Bondone. There were plans to visit Plan de Corones for the first time; however, bad weather prevented the unpaved climb from being used. It instead saw its debut in the Giro d'Italia in 2008.

Race overview

Classification leadership

In the 2006 Giro d'Italia, four different jerseys were awarded. For the general classification, calculated by adding each cyclist's finishing times on each stage, and allowing time bonuses for the first three finishers on mass start stages, the leader received a pink jersey. This classification is considered the most important of the Giro d'Italia, and the winner is considered the winner of the Giro.

Additionally, there was a points classification, which awarded a mauve jersey. In the points classification, cyclists got points for finishing in the top 15 in a stage. The stage win awarded 25 points, second place awarded 20 points, third 16, fourth 14, fifth 12, sixth 10, and one point less per place down the line, to a single point for 15th. In addition, some points could be won in intermediate sprints.

There was also a mountains classification, which awarded a green jersey. In the mountains classifications, points were won by reaching the top of a mountain before other cyclists. Each climb was categorized, either first, second, or third category, with more points available for the higher-categorized climbs. The highest point in the Giro (called the Cima Coppi), which in 2006 was the Passo di Gavia in stage 20, afforded still more points than the other first-category climbs.

The fourth was the combination classification, which awarded a blue jersey. In the combination classification, the top 15 placed riders each day in the general, points, mountains, and 110 Gazzetta classifications earned points, 15 for first and one point less per place down the line, to a single point for 15th. These points were tallied throughout the Giro.

There were also two classifications for teams. The first was the Trofeo Fast Team. In this classification, the times of the best three cyclists per team on each stage are added, and the team with the lowest time is leading team. The Trofeo Super Team was a team points classification, with the top 20 placed riders on each stage earning points (20 for first place, 19 for second place and so on, down to a single point for 20th) for their team.

Final standings

General classification

Points classification

Mountains classification

Combination classification

Trofeo Fast Team classification

Trofeo Super Team classification

Minor classifications

Other less well-known classifications, whose leaders did not receive a special jersey, were awarded during the Giro. Other awards included the Combativity classification, which was a compilation of points gained for position on crossing intermediate sprints, mountain passes and stage finishes. Italian Paolo Bettini won the Most Combative classification. Bettini also won the 110 Gazzetta classification. The Azzurri d'Italia classification was based on finishing order, but points were awarded only to the top three finishers in each stage. Ivan Basso won the Azzurri d'Italia classification. The Trofeo Fuga Piaggio classification rewarded riders who took part in a breakaway at the head of the field, each rider in an escape of ten or fewer riders getting one point for each kilometre that the group stayed clear. The classification was won by Christophe Edaleine.  Teams were given penalty points for minor technical infringements.  were most successful in avoiding penalties, and so won the Fair Play classification.

References

Footnotes

Citations

External links

cyclingnews.com - race reports and news features

 
2006 UCI ProTour
2006
2006 in Italian sport
2006 Giro d'Italia
May 2006 sports events in Europe